The term cross-reference (abbreviation: xref) can refer to either:
 An instance within a document which refers to related information elsewhere in the same document. In both printed and online dictionaries cross-references are important because they form a network structure of relations existing between different parts of data, dictionary-internal as well as dictionary external.
 In an index, a cross-reference is often denoted by See also.  For example, under the term Albert Einstein in the index of a book about Nobel Laureates, there may be the cross-reference See also: Einstein, Albert.
 In hypertext, cross-referencing is maintained to a document with either in-context (XRIC) or out-of-context (XROC) cross-referencing.  These are similar to KWIC and KWOC.
 In programming, "cross-referencing" means the listing of every file name and line number where a given named identifier occurs within the program's source tree.
 In a relational database management system, a table can have an xref as prefix or suffix to indicate it is a cross-reference table that joins two or more tables together via primary key.

Structure 
In a document, especially those authored in a content management system,
a cross-reference has two major aspects:
 A visible form that appears when the document is presented to the reader
 A technical mechanism that resides within the system

The visible form contains text, graphics, and other indications that:
 Enable the reader to follow the cross-reference to the referenced content
 May enable the reader to understand what is being referred to, or what to expect upon following the reference
 May present to the reader some information from the referenced content

The technical mechanism that resides within the system:
 Identifies what location is being referred to
 Permits the system to present appropriate referencing text when the location containing the reference is presented to a reader
 Permits the system to offer a control (such as a link) that a reader can use when the content is presented in electronic form to access the referenced content

Enhancing usability 
If the cross-reference mechanism is well designed, the reader will be able to follow each cross-reference to the referenced content whether the content is presented in print or electronically.

An author working in a content management system is responsible for identifying subjects of interest that cross documents, and creating appropriate systems of cross-references to support readers who seek to understand those subjects. For an individual cross-reference, an author should ensure that location and content of the target of the cross-reference are clearly identified, and the reader can easily determine how to follow the cross-reference in each medium in which publication is supported.

Content strategy practitioners (known as content strategists) specialize in planning content to meet business needs, taking into account the processes for creating and maintaining the content, and the systems that support the content.

See also 
Credo Reference

References 

Reference